Lamar Gary "Jake" Jacobs (June 9, 1937 – July 26, 2010) was a professional baseball outfielder.

A native of Youngstown, Ohio, Jacobs attended Boardman High School and graduated from Ohio University. He was signed as a bonus baby non-drafted free agent by the Washington Senators in 1959, being immediately allocated to Class-D Sanford Greyhounds. In his professional debut, Jacobs led his team with a .313 batting average and a 448 slugging percentage, gaining a promotion to the Class-A Charlotte Hornets the next year.

Jacobs spent most of 1960 with Charlotte before joining the Senators in late September, appearing in two games as a pinch hitter and four as a pinch runner. He ascended to Triple-A in 1961, and split the season between the Syracuse Chiefs and Indianapolis Indians before returning to the majors in September for four games with the Minnesota Twins (the Senators had moved to Minneapolis-St. Paul, Minnesota during the offseason). He played two more years in the minors, for the Vancouver Mounties in 1962 and Charlotte again in 1963.

In his brief majors career, Jacobs was a .200 hitter (2-for-10) and scored two runs in 10 games. In five minor league seasons, he posted a .277 average in 545 games.

Jacobs died in Palmetto, Florida where he lived, at the age of 73 from dementia.

Sources

Major League Baseball outfielders
Minnesota Twins players
Washington Senators (1901–1960) players
Charlotte Hornets (baseball) players
Indianapolis Indians players
Sanford Greyhounds players
Syracuse Chiefs players
Vancouver Mounties players
Baseball players from Ohio
Ohio Bobcats baseball players
1937 births
2010 deaths
Deaths from dementia in Florida
People from Palmetto, Florida